Bruno Antunes de Oliveira (born 11 January 1993), known as Bruno Oliveira or simply Bruno, is a Brazilian footballer who plays for Madureira as a right back.

Career
Born in Pindamonhangaba, Bruno Oliveira joined Palmeiras' youth setup in 2010, aged 17, after a short stint with Mirassol. On 25 November 2012 he played his first match as a professional, starting and playing the full 90 minutes in a 1–2 home loss against Atlético Goianiense for the Série A championship.

On 4 October 2013, Bruno Oliveira signed a new four-year deal with Verdão. After being sparingly used, he joined Guarani on loan until the end of the year on 1 May of the following year.

References

External links
 Bruno Oliveira at playmakerstats.com (English version of ogol.com.br)
 

1993 births
Living people
People from Pindamonhangaba
Brazilian footballers
Association football defenders
Campeonato Brasileiro Série A players
Campeonato Brasileiro Série B players
Campeonato Brasileiro Série C players
Sociedade Esportiva Palmeiras players
Guarani FC players
Oeste Futebol Clube players
Clube Atlético Penapolense players
Vila Nova Futebol Clube players
Clube Atlético Bragantino players
Mirassol Futebol Clube players
Nacional Atlético Clube (SP) players
Paysandu Sport Club players
Águia de Marabá Futebol Clube players
Marília Atlético Clube players
Footballers from São Paulo (state)